The 2019 Cork Junior Hurling Championship was the 122nd staging of the Cork Junior Hurling Championship since its establishment by the Cork County Board in 1895. The championship draw took place on 2 September 2019. The championship began on 14 September 2019 and ended on 3 November 2019.

On 3 November 2019, Russell Rovers won the championship after a 1-17 to 0-09 defeat of Carrignavar in the final at Páirc Uí Rinn. This was their first ever championship title.

Qualification

The Cork Junior Hurling Championship features fourteen teams in the final tournament. Over 70 teams contested the seven divisional championships with the seven respective champions and runners-up automatically qualifying for the county series.

Fixtures/results

Round 1

Quarter-finals

Semi-finals

Final

References

External links
 Cork GAA website

Cork Junior Hurling Championship
Cork Junior Hurling Championship